The Suey Sing Association is a historical Chinese American association that was established in 1867. Formerly known as the Suey Sing Tong, this was changed to its current name in 1920. In early 1994, the Suey Sing Association became the first organization in the Chinese community to fly the flag of the People's Republic of China.  Currently there are more than 1000 members.

Branches

The Suey Sing Association has several branches in the United States and Canada including in:
 Los Angeles, California - 755 Yale Street
 Marysville, California - 305 1st Street (relocated to Sacramento) 
 Oakland, California - 331 8th Street
 Portland, Oregon - 8743 SE Powell Blvd  
 Sacramento, California - 1716 Broadway 
 Salinas, California - 25 Soledad Street
 San Francisco, California - 925 Grant Avenue
 Seattle, Washington - 815 S Weller Street Suite 112
 Stockton, California - 345 S San Joaquin Street
 Watsonville, California - 118 Bridge Street (defunct)
 Richmond, British Columbia - 11180 # 210 Bridgeport Rd

References

Chinatown, San Francisco
Chinese-American organizations
Tongs (organizations)